Porirua was a New Zealand parliamentary electorate in the North Island. It existed during two periods; from 1860 to 1870, and then from 1963 to 1996.

Population centres

This electorate was based on Porirua City, north of Wellington.

History
The electorate was first created in 1860 for the term of the 3rd New Zealand Parliament. It existed until the end of the 4th Parliament in 1870. Alfred Brandon was the representative during that period.

The electorate was recreated in 1963 for the 34th Parliament. In 1996 with MMP, the electorate was replaced by the new Mana electorate. The holder of Porirua, Graham Kelly chose to become a list MP in 2002.

From 1963 to 1996, the electorate was held by three Labour Party representatives: Henry May, Gerry Wall, and Graham Kelly.

Election results
Key

1993 election

1990 election

1987 election

1984 election

1981 election

1978 election

1975 election

1972 election

1969 election

1966 election

1963 election

Notes

References

Historical electorates of New Zealand
Porirua
1860 establishments in New Zealand
1996 disestablishments in New Zealand
1870 disestablishments in New Zealand
1963 establishments in New Zealand